Senga Nicolás Kata Martínez (born 15 January 1993), known as Niko Kata, is a Spanish-born Equatoguinean footballer who plays as a midfielder for Cerdanyola del Vallès and the Equatorial Guinea national team.

Club career
Born in Barcelona, Catalonia, to a Congolese father and an Equatoguinean mother, Kata finished his formation with CE L'Hospitalet. After failing to make a competitive appearance for the side, he made his senior debut with Dinàmic Batlló Esportiu in the regional leagues, scoring 27 goals in only 33 appearances.

In 2013 Kata joined UD Viladecans, and featured regularly before moving to FC Santboià. After contributing with 13 goals but missing out promotion in the play-offs, he signed for Tercera División club CF Gavà on 19 June 2015.

On 10 July 2017, Kata signed for Atlético Saguntino in Segunda División B.

In early 2020, Kata was signed by Ecuadorian club Delfín SC, managed then by Spaniard Ángel López, who had been his head coach in the Equatorial Guinea national team. In mid 2020, he returned to Spain and signed for CF Montañesa in Tercera División. On 14 January 2021, he was signed by Nicaraguan club Real Estelí FC.

International career
Eligible for Spain, Congo DR and Equatorial Guinea, Kata opted to represent the latter. He made his debut for them on 11 October 2016 starting in a friendly against Lebanon.

References

External links

1993 births
Living people
Citizens of Equatorial Guinea through descent
Equatoguinean footballers
Association football midfielders
Association football forwards
Delfín S.C. footballers
Real Estelí F.C. players
Futuro Kings FC players
Nicaraguan Primera División players
Equatorial Guinea international footballers
Equatoguinean people of Democratic Republic of the Congo descent
Sportspeople of Democratic Republic of the Congo descent
Equatoguinean expatriate footballers
Equatoguinean expatriates in Ecuador
Expatriate footballers in Ecuador
Equatoguinean expatriates in Nicaragua
Expatriate footballers in Nicaragua
Footballers from Barcelona
Spanish footballers
CE L'Hospitalet players
FC Santboià players
CF Gavà players
Atlético Saguntino players
Extremadura UD footballers
UD San Sebastián de los Reyes players
Valencia CF Mestalla footballers
Real Unión footballers
CF Montañesa players
Club Portugalete players
Cerdanyola del Vallès FC players
Divisiones Regionales de Fútbol players
Primera Catalana players
Tercera División players
Segunda División B players
Spanish sportspeople of African descent
Spanish people of Democratic Republic of the Congo descent
Spanish sportspeople of Equatoguinean descent
Spanish expatriate footballers
Spanish expatriate sportspeople in Ecuador
Spanish expatriate sportspeople in Nicaragua